MRTV is a television network owned by Myanmar Radio and Television. It was launch in 3rd June, 1980 and First ever television network launch in Myanmar.

History 
Television service in Myanmar was first introduced in June 1979 as a test trial in Yangon. MRTV was first launched on 3 June 1980, with broadcasts in color beginning on 1 November. Regular television service was formally launched in 1981 using the NTSC standard. In 2005, MRTV had 195 television relay stations throughout the country.

In October 2013, MRTV started broadcasting on digital terrestrial with DVB-T2 System, same as most ASEAN Countries. 18 TV channels and 3 Myanmar Radio channels are on MRTV multiplex system. MRTV plans the news interface, to the modern style of starting sequences and will have well-decorated news room. The broadcasting hours also increased to 18 hours (previously 10 hours).  On February 15, 2015, MRTV adding 5 new TV channels to their Multplex Play Out system, such as MRTV-4, Channel 7, 5 Plus, MNTV and Channel 9.

On March 24, 2018, MRTV adding 5 new TV channels to their Multiplex Play out System, such as Mizzima TV, DVB TV, Channel K, YTV and Fortune TV.

Programming

Digital television

Digital sub channels

Relay Station

See also 

 MRTV Network
 MITV
 MRTV-4
 MWD
 Television in Myanmar
 Media in Myanmar

References

External links 
 Official site of MRTV (Burmese)

Mass media in Myanmar
Television channels in Myanmar
Television channels and stations established in 1979
Mass media in Yangon
Television in Myanmar